Teresa Renkenberger is a woman from Flowood, Mississippi who created a mobile shower truck for homeless people in the Jackson, Mississippi area. The truck, which she calls "Shower Power", is a converted food truck.

References

Sources

External links

Living people
People from Flowood, Mississippi
Year of birth missing (living people)